Banksia seneciifolia is a species of column-shaped shrub that is endemic to the south-west of Western Australia. It has linear, pinnatifid leaves, yellow flowers in heads of about twenty-five, and narrow egg-shaped follicles.

Description
Banksia seneciifolia is a column-shaped shrub that grows to a height of  but does not form a lignotuber. Flowering occurs from July to August.

Taxonomy and naming
This species was first formally described in 1830 by Robert Brown who gave it the name Dryandra seneciifolia and published the description in the Supplementum primum Prodromi florae Novae Hollandiae from specimens collected by William Baxter near King George's Sound in 1829. The specific epithet (seneciifolia) refers to the genus Senecio with the ending -folia from the Latin -folius meaning "-leaved".

In 2007, Austin Mast and Kevin Thiele transferred all the dryandras to the genus Banksia and this species became Banksia seneciifolia.

Distribution and habitat
Banksia seneciifolia grows in mallee-kwongan in the Stirling Range National Park but there are record from before 1900 as far south as Albany.

Conservation status
This banksia is classified as "Priority Four" by the Government of Western Australia Department of Parks and Wildlife, meaning that is rare or near threatened.

References

 

seneciifolia
Taxa named by Robert Brown (botanist, born 1773)
Plants described in 1830